Sillikers is a Canadian rural community in Northumberland County, New Brunswick.

It is located on the Southwest Miramichi River along Highway 420.

History

Notable people

See also
List of communities in New Brunswick

References
 

Communities in Northumberland County, New Brunswick